Beau James Graham (born ) is an Australian male volleyball player. He is part of the Australia men's national volleyball team. On club level he plays for Saaremaa in Estonia.

Sporting achievements

Clubs
National cup
 2019/2020  Estonian Cup 2019, with Saaremaa

National team
 2019  Asian Championship

References

External links
 profile at FIVB.org

1994 births
Living people
Australian men's volleyball players
Place of birth missing (living people)
Expatriate volleyball players in Greece
Expatriate sportspeople in Sweden
Expatriate volleyball players in Estonia
Expatriate volleyball players in France
Expatriate volleyball players in Romania
Expatriate sportspeople in the Czech Republic